Martin Gauger (August 4, 1905 Elberfeld – July 14, 1941 Pirna) was a German jurist and pacifist from Wuppertal, Rhenish Prussia. He was a member of the Kreisau Circle which sought to overthrow the Nazi regime in Germany during the Second World War.

He was the fifth of eight children. From 1924-1930 he studied legal science and economics in Tübingen, Kiel, London, Berlin and Breslau. In 1934, as a lawyer in the office of the public prosecutor in München-Gladbach, Gauger refused to take the required oath of allegiance to Hitler and resigned from the civil service. In a subsequent post as legal advisor to the Bekenntniskirche (confessing church) he devoted himself to the resistance movement. On 17 May 1940 he fled to the Netherlands by swimming across the Rhine River. Unfortunately he arrived just as the German Wehrmacht invaded the neutral country. He was wounded and captured, imprisoned until June 1941 in Düsseldorf-Derendorf. On 12 June, he was brought to Buchenwald concentration camp; on 14 July 1941 he was sent to Sonnenstein Euthanasia Centre, where he was murdered.

See also
 List of peace activists

References
Louis L. Snyder (1998), Encyclopedia of the Third Reich,
Werner Oehme: Märtyrer der evangelischen Christenheit. 1933-1945. Neunundzwanzig Lebensbilder. (in German).Berlin 1979, p. 72-79.

1905 births
1941 deaths
Jurists from North Rhine-Westphalia
German pacifists
German people who died in Buchenwald concentration camp
German resistance members
People from Wuppertal
People from the Rhine Province
Aktion T4 victims